Appenzeller may refer to either of two Swiss breeds of chicken:

 The Appenzeller Barthuhn
 The Appenzeller Spitzhauben